Calinda is a genus of true bugs belonging to the family Triozidae.

The species of this genus are found in America.

Species:

 Calinda aguilari 
 Calinda albonigra 
 Calinda ambigua 
 Calinda antucana 
 Calinda araucana 
 Calinda baccharidis 
 Calinda beingoleai 
 Calinda boldti 
 Calinda brevicauda 
 Calinda broomfieldi 
 Calinda chionophili 
 Calinda collaris 
 Calinda falciforceps 
 Calinda fumipennis 
 Calinda gibbosa 
 Calinda gladiformis 
 Calinda graciliforceps 
 Calinda hodkinsoni 
 Calinda hollisi 
 Calinda huggerti 
 Calinda inca 
 Calinda jibara 
 Calinda lineata 
 Calinda longicaudata 
 Calinda longicollis 
 Calinda longistylus 
 Calinda magniforceps 
 Calinda mendocina 
 Calinda microcephala 
 Calinda muiscas 
 Calinda osorii 
 Calinda otavalo 
 Calinda panamensis 
 Calinda parviceps 
 Calinda patagonica 
 Calinda pehuenche 
 Calinda penai 
 Calinda peruana 
 Calinda peterseni 
 Calinda plaumanni 
 Calinda proximata 
 Calinda reversyi 
 Calinda salicifoliae 
 Calinda simoni 
 Calinda spatulata 
 Calinda testacea 
 Calinda trinervis 
 Calinda tuthilli 
 Calinda velardei 
 Calinda yungas

References 

Triozidae